Southeast Correctional Center is a Missouri Department of Corrections maximum security state prison for men located in Charleston, Mississippi County, Missouri. It opened in 2001, and has a maximum capacity of 1,658 inmates.

References

Prisons in Missouri
Buildings and structures in Mississippi County, Missouri
2001 establishments in Missouri